Joseph Freeman (born July 18, 1948) is an American fencer. He competed in the individual and team foil events at the 1972 Summer Olympics.

References

External links
 

1948 births
Living people
American male foil fencers
Olympic fencers of the United States
Fencers at the 1972 Summer Olympics
Fencers from Philadelphia